Arie de Geus (born 1930, died 2019) was a Dutch business executive, business theorist and scenario planner, who was the head of Royal Dutch Shell's Strategic Planning Group and was a public speaker.

Life and work 
De Geus was born in Rotterdam in 1930. He joined Royal Dutch/Shell in 1951 and remained there until his retirement in 1989. During his tenure as head of Shell's Strategic Planning Group, the department made important advancements to the ideas of portfolio analysis (i.e. Directional Policy Matrix) and scenario planning.  Other key members of the team were Kees van der Heijden, Peter Schwartz, and Pierre Wack.

After he retired, Mr. de Geus was a visiting fellow of London Business School and has worked with MIT's Center for Organizational Learning.

A popular quote of his: “The ability to learn faster than your competitors may be the only sustainable competitive advantage.”

Publications
 "The Living Company" Nicholas Brealey, London (1997)

Articles, a selection:
 "The Living Company," Harvard Business Review, 1997; winner of the McKinsey Award
 "Companies: What Are They?" Lecture Royal Society of Arts, 1995
 "Planning as Learning" Harvard Business Review (1988)

References

External links

Arie de Geus at ariedegeus.com
Dialog on leadership

1930 births
Living people
Businesspeople from Rotterdam
Dutch business theorists